Bridgeport is an unincorporated community in far western Darby Township, Union County, Ohio, United States. It lies at the intersection of State Route 38 with Orchard Road, midway between the villages of Milford Center and Unionville Center. At Bridgeport, Buck Run meets the Big Darby Creek, which meets the Scioto River at Circleville.

References

Unincorporated communities in Union County, Ohio
Unincorporated communities in Ohio